Shakarian or Shakaryan is an Armenian surname. Notable people with the surname include:

 David Shakarian (1914–1984), American businessman
 Demos Shakarian (1913–1993), American businessman
 Paulo Shakarian, American businessman, professor, and author

Armenian-language surnames